The Sneetches and Other Stories is a collection of stories by American children's author Dr. Seuss, published in 1961. It is composed of four separate stories with themes of tolerance, diversity, and compromise: "The Sneetches", "The Zax", "Too Many Daves", and "What Was I Scared Of?". Based on an online poll, the National Education Association listed the book as one of its "Teachers' Top 100 Books for Children". In 2012 it was ranked number 63 among the Top 100 Picture Books in a survey published by School Library Journal – the fifth of five Dr. Seuss books on the list.

The first two stories in the book ("The Sneetches" and "The Zax") were later adapted, along with Green Eggs and Ham, into 1973's animated TV musical special Dr. Seuss on the Loose: The Sneetches, The Zax, Green Eggs and Ham with Hans Conried voicing the narrator and both Zax, and Paul Winchell and Bob Holt voicing the Sneetches and Sylvester McMonkey McBean respectively.

A 45-minute CGI animated special based on The Sneetches is in development for Netflix.

Stories

The Sneetches 
 
The first story in the collection tells of a group of yellow bird-like creatures called the Sneetches, some of whom have a green star on their bellies. At the beginning of the story, Sneetches with stars discriminate against and shun those without. An entrepreneur named Sylvester McMonkey McBean (calling himself the Fix-It-Up Chappie) appears and offers the Sneetches without stars the chance to get them with his Star-On machine, for three dollars. The treatment is instantly popular, but this upsets the original Star-Bellied Sneetches, as they are in danger of losing their special status. McBean then tells them about his Star-Off machine, costing ten dollars, and the Sneetches who originally had stars happily pay the money to have them removed in order to remain special. However, McBean does not share the prejudices of the Sneetches and allows the recently starred Sneetches through this machine as well. Ultimately, this escalates, with the Sneetches running from one machine to the next...
 "...until neither the Plain nor the Star-Bellies knew
 whether this one was that one... or that one was this one...
 or which one was what one... or what one was who".
This continues until the Sneetches are penniless and McBean departs as a rich man, amused by their folly. Despite his assertion that "you can't teach a Sneetch", the Sneetches learn from this experience that neither Plain-Bellied nor Star-Bellied Sneetches are superior, and they are able to get along and become friends. "The Sneetches" was intended by Seuss as a satire of discrimination between races and cultures, and was specifically inspired by his opposition to antisemitism.

The Zax 
In "The Zax", a North-going Zax and a South-going Zax meet face to face on the Prairie of Prax. Each asks the other to make way, but neither budges, saying it is against their upbringing to move any other way. Because they stubbornly refuse to move (east, west, or any direction except their respective headings) to get past each other, the two Zax then faces off against each other with their arms crossed. The Zax stand so long that eventually a highway overpass is built around them. The story ends with the Zax still standing there "unbudged" in their tracks.

Too Many Daves 
"Too Many Daves" is a very short story about a mother, Mrs. McCave, who named all 23 of her sons Dave. This causes minor problems in the family, and the majority of the story lists unusual and amusing names she wishes she had given them, such as "Bodkin Van Horn", "Hoos Foos", "Snimm", "Hot-Shot", "Shadrack", "Stuffy", "Stinky", "Putt-Putt", "Buffalo Bill", "Oliver Boliver Butt", "Biffalo Buff" or "Zanzibar Buck-Buck McFate". The story ends with the statement that "she didn't do it, and now it's too late".

What Was I Scared Of? 
"What Was I Scared Of?" tells the tale of a character who frequently encounters an empty pair of pale-green pants in dark and spooky locations. The character, who is the narrator, is initially afraid of the pants, which are able to stand freely despite the lack of a wearer. However, when he screams for help, the pants also start to cry, and he realizes that "they were just as scared as I!" The empty pants and the narrator become friends. This is one of the few Seuss works in verse that is not anapestic tetrameter.

Distribution by NATO in Bosnia 

In 1998, NATO translated the collection into Serbo-Croatian and planned to distribute 500,000 copies to children in Bosnia and Herzegovina, as part of a campaign to encourage tolerance. This was later scaled back to 50,000 copies at a cost of $120,000 as well as looking for a more appropriate source of funding such as an NGO, private charity or corporation, as this expenditure did not meet the "Minimum Military Requirement" test for NATO common funding eligibility.

References 

1961 short story collections
1961 children's books
Books by Dr. Seuss
American picture books
Discrimination in fiction
Children's short story collections
Random House books
Works originally published in Redbook
American short story collections